Robert David Kaylor (born 1933) was James Sprunt Professor of Religion at Davidson College. He obtained his PhD at Duke University.

In his book, Jesus the Prophet: His Vision of the Kingdom on Earth, Kaylor argues that Jesus was a social and political reformer who was driven by a desire to return a supposed pre-monarchical egalitarianism.

Works

Thesis

Books

References

New Testament scholars
Living people
Davidson College faculty
Duke University alumni
1933 births